Lebo–Waverly USD 243 is a public unified school district headquartered in Waverly, Kansas, United States, serving the northern part of Coffey County.  The district includes the communities of Lebo, Waverly, and nearby rural areas.

Administration
Lebo–Waverly USD 243 is currently under the administration of superintendent Corey Reese.

Board of Education
The USD 243 Board of Education meetings are held on the second Monday of every month at Central Office in Waverly, and begin at 7:00 p.m.

Schools
The school district operates the following schools:
 Waverly High School in Waverly
 Lebo High School in Lebo
 Waverly Grade School in Waverly
 Lebo Grade School in Lebo

See also
 Kansas State Department of Education
 Kansas State High School Activities Association
 List of high schools in Kansas
 List of unified school districts in Kansas

References

External links
 

School districts in Kansas
Schools in Coffey County, Kansas